Ski Brule is a ski area located in Stambaugh Township, Iron County, near Iron River, Michigan. Ski Brule has seventeen ski runs and eleven ski lifts. The trails include one double black diamond, three black diamonds, six blue squares, five green circles, and a 30-acre terrain park consisting of two trails. All lifts converge at the same general point on the hill and the runs spread out and around the mountain.

References

Ski areas and resorts in Michigan
Tourist attractions in Iron County, Michigan